David Michael Roddy (born March 27, 2001) is an American professional basketball player for the Memphis Grizzlies of the National Basketball Association (NBA). He played college basketball for the Colorado State Rams.

In high school, Roddy played basketball, football, and track and field, receiving Division I scholarship offers for the first two. He ultimately chose to play college basketball for Colorado State. With the Rams, he was named to the First-team All-Mountain West in his sophomore and junior seasons, and was named the Mountain West Player of the Year in his junior season. He was drafted 23rd overall in the 2022 NBA draft by the Philadelphia 76ers, but was later traded to the Grizzlies.

High school career
Roddy was a three-sport athlete at Breck School in Golden Valley, Minnesota, competing in basketball, football and track and field. As a senior, he averaged 29.7 points and 16.6 rebounds per game for the basketball team. Roddy was an all-state quarterback in football and won a Class A state title in the discus. He committed to play college basketball for Colorado State over offers from Minnesota, Northwestern, and other NCAA Division I programs. Before committing to college basketball, Roddy also received football scholarship offers from multiple Division I programs.

College career
As a freshman, Roddy averaged 11.4 points and 5.6 rebounds per game for Colorado State. On January 22, 2020, Roddy recorded a freshman season-high 26 points and eight rebounds in a 86–68 win over Fresno State. 

As a sophomore, he averaged 15.9 points and 9.4 rebounds per game, and was named first-team All-Mountain West. On January 27, 2021, Roddy posted 27 points and 15 rebounds in a 78–56 victory over Boise State.

Roddy had a career year as a junior during 2021–22 season. He went 57.1% on field goals and 43.8% on three-pointers — up from 51.2% and 27.8% in 2020–21. He averaged 19.2 points, 7.5 rebounds, and 2.9 assists a game. Roddy was named the Mountain West Player of the Year, as well as being named first-team All-Mountain West for the second consecutive year. Roddy led the Rams to their first NCAA tournament appearance since 2013 before declaring for the 2022 NBA draft on March 30, 2022.

Professional career

Memphis Grizzlies (2022–present) 
In the 2022 NBA draft, Roddy was drafted 23rd overall by the Philadelphia 76ers on behalf of the Memphis Grizzlies as part of a trade that sent Roddy and Danny Green to the Grizzlies in exchange for De'Anthony Melton. On July 2, 2022, Roddy signed his rookie scale contract with the Grizzlies. Roddy made his NBA debut on October 19, grabbing two rebounds in a 115–112 overtime win over the New York Knicks. On March 11, 2023, Roddy scored a career-high 24 points in a 112–108 win over the Dallas Mavericks.

Career statistics

College

|-
| style="text-align:left;"| 2019–20
| style="text-align:left;"| Colorado State
| 32 || 19 || 25.6 || .465 || .195 || .739 || 5.6 || 1.8 || .6 || .8 || 11.4
|-
| style="text-align:left;"| 2020–21
| style="text-align:left;"| Colorado State
| 28 || 26 || 31.5 || .512 || .278 || .789 || 9.4 || 2.6 || .9 || .7 || 15.9
|-
| style="text-align:left;"| 2021–22
| style="text-align:left;"| Colorado State
| 31 || 31 || 32.9 || .571 || .438 || .691 || 7.5 || 2.9 || 1.2 || 1.1 || 19.2
|- class="sortbottom"
| style="text-align:center;" colspan="2"| Career
| 91 || 76 || 29.9 || .522 || .319 || .739 || 7.4 || 2.4 || .9 || .8 || 15.5

References

External links

Colorado State Rams bio

2001 births
Living people
American men's basketball players
Basketball players from Minneapolis
Colorado State Rams men's basketball players
Memphis Grizzlies players
Philadelphia 76ers draft picks
Small forwards